Steinar Hoen (born 8 February 1971) is a retired Norwegian high jumper. He represented IK Tjalve during his senior career. He has been the meeting director for the Bislett Games since 2007. His indoor and outdoor bests are both 2.36 m – these are also the Norwegian records for the event.

Career
In his early career he finished eleventh at the 1990 World Junior Championships, fourteenth at the 1991 World Championships, ninth at the 1992 European Indoor Championships and ninth at the 1993 IAAF World Indoor Championships. He competed at the 1992 Summer Olympics together with Håkon Särnblom without reaching the finals.

In 1994 he finished fourth at the European Indoor Championships before winning the European Championships in August with a jump of 2.35 metres. This result was a competition record for exactly twelve years, until Andrey Silnov surpassed it by 2.36 m.

Hoen came close to medals in 1995, with fourth places from both the World Indoor Championships and World Championships, before he won another European medal with a bronze medal at the 1996 European Indoor Championships. He then finished fifth at the 1996 Summer Olympics, eighth at the 1997 IAAF World Indoor Championships, fourth at the 1997 World Championships and sixth at the 1998 European Championships. He became Norwegian champion in the years 1991 and 1993-1998.

His personal best jump was 2.36 metres, achieved in July 1997 in Oslo. This is the current Norwegian record. He cleared 2.30 metres or more 32 times, whereas Särnblom only cleared this height or more twice. Hoen already had a personal indoor best of 2.36 m, from February 1994 in Balingen.

Hoen intended to make a brief comeback at the 2006 Norwegian championships, but failed to show up at the competition.

He lives at Strand.

Competition record

References

1971 births
Living people
Norwegian male high jumpers
Athletes (track and field) at the 1992 Summer Olympics
Athletes (track and field) at the 1996 Summer Olympics
Olympic athletes of Norway
European Athletics Championships medalists
Competitors at the 1998 Goodwill Games